Vasum globulus is a rare species of medium-sized predatory sea snail, a marine gastropod mollusk in the family Turbinellidae, subfamily Vasinae, the vase snails.

Subspecies:
 Vasum globulus nuttingi (J. Henderson, 1919)  (synonym: Turbinella nuttingi J. Henderson, 1919)

Description
The shell of the species is almost spherical, which is unusual in vase snails, hence the specific name globulus. The maximum recorded size of the shell is 43 mm, but it is small compared to that of other species in the same genus.

Distribution
This species appears to be endemic to a few small islands in the Leeward Island chain of the Lesser Antilles, West Indies. It has been recorded from the following islands:
 Barbuda
 Antigua
 Sint Eustatius

References

 Lamarck J.B. (1816). Liste des objets représentés dans les planches de cette livraison. In: Tableau encyclopédique et méthodique des trois règnes de la Nature. Mollusques et Polypes divers. Agasse, Paris.

External links
  Dillwyn, L. W. (1817). A descriptive catalogue of Recent shells, arranged according to the Linnean method; with particular attention to the synonymy. London: John and Arthur Arch. Vol. 1: 1-580; Vol. 2: 581-1092 + index
 R. Tucker Abbott - The family Vasidae in the Indo-Pacific; Indo-Paciflc Mollusca vol. 1
 Abbott R.T.(1950) - The Genera Xancus and Vasum in the Western Atlantic; Johnsonia v. 2 19-32
 Malacolog info on the species
 A pdf of a 1999 paper on the species

globulus
Taxa named by Jean-Baptiste Lamarck
Gastropods described in 1816